Miss Teacher is a 2015 Nigerian drama film directed by Serah Donald Onyeachor. It stars Chika Ike, Joseph Benjamin, Liz Benson Ameye and more. The film, which is produced by Chika Ike is the first production from her production company.

Plot
Miss Teacher Nwanne is a kind young lady who due to events in her life came to find herself in a community with broken down educational facilities and little amenities. Instead of letting her past weigh her down, she accepts her new environment. She got a job as a teacher in the community school where she helps the students in the school overcome their struggles.

Cast
Chika Ike as Nwanne
Joseph Benjamin as Jude
Liz Benson as Principal

Production
Miss Teacher was majorly shot in Enugu State.

Release
The film premiered at the Genesis Deluxe Cinema Enugu on 26 December 2014. It was released nationwide on 25 September 2015, but some teaser trailers were released online on 14 September 2015.

References

External links

English-language Nigerian films
2015 romantic drama films
Nigerian romantic drama films
Nigerian nonlinear narrative films
2010s English-language films